Abdul Moshabbir (-28 November 2018) Politician of Habiganj district of Bangladesh, Lawyer And elected a member of parliament from Habiganj-1.

Birth and early life 
Abdul Moshabbir was born in 1938 in Srimatpur village of Kaliar Bhanga Union in Nabiganj upazila of Habiganj district of Sylhet Division.

Career 
Moshabbir was a lawyer who was the president of Habiganj District Awami Bar Association. He was the president of Habiganj district bar and general secretary of the district bar. He was elected to parliament from Habiganj-1 as a Jatiya Samajtantrik Dal (JASAD) In 1988 Bangladeshi general election.

He lost the Jatiya Sangsad elections of 1991 Habiganj-1 constituency with the nomination of Jatiya Samajtantrik Dal-JSD. He then joined the Awami League.

Death 
Abdul Moshabbir died on 28 November 2018 in Habiganj.

References 

1930s births
2018 deaths
Year of birth uncertain
People from Habiganj District
Jatiya Samajtantrik Dal politicians
Awami League politicians
4th Jatiya Sangsad members